Lobophytum oligoverrucum is a species of soft coral in the family Alcyoniidae and the genus Lobophytum.

References 

Alcyoniidae
Animals described in 1984